Splitting Headache is the second album by American hardcore punk band Down to Nothing.

Track listing
Go Ahead wit Yo' Fake Ass – 0:52
Us V. Each Other – 1:49
I Can't Believe My Eyes – 2:29
Smash It – 0:54
Burn III – 1:55
Unbreakable – 2:22
Home Sweet Home – 1:39
We're on the Run – 1:54
Risk It – 0:56
Skate & Annoy, Vol. 2.0 (Skate or Die) – 0:11
I'm So Lucky – 1:48

Personnel

Production
 Gary Llama – recording (tracks 8–11)

References

2005 albums
Down to Nothing albums